Hina Dilpazeer Khan credited as Hina Dilpazeer is a Pakistani actress, comedian and host. Known for her comic roles, she is widely regarded as one of the popular comedian and actresses of Pakistan. Khan made her first professional screen debut in Fasih Bari Khan's telefilm Burns Road Ki Neelofar in 2008 as Saeeda, for which she received 2009 Kara Film Festival award for Best Female Actor in a Supporting Role. She then appeared in number of television films including PTV's drama serial Thora Sa Asman which further earned her wide recognition and critical appraisal and the drama Quddusi Sahab Ki Bewa in which she did 30+ characters, through which she garned appraisal and proved herself as one of the finest actors, she is most well known for her role as Momo in the Pakistani Sitcom Bulbulay.

Dilpazeer's performance in sitcom Bulbulay as Momo has created a cult following, which led her to the international acclaim and recognition. She received her first Lux Style Award nomination as Best TV Actress – Satellite at 11th Lux Style Awards for her performance in Tum Ho Ke Chup. She further gain critical acclaim with character comedy Quddusi Sahab Ki Bewah where she portrayed twelve different characters, including Shakooran and Rooh Afza that earned her the title of "most versatile" actor of recent times, and her second Lux Style Award nomination as Best TV Actress – Satellite at 12th Lux Style Awards. Dilpazeer's other noted serials are Annie Ki Ayegi Baraat, Ladies Park, Khatoon Manzil, Mithu Aur Aapa and Googly Mohalla.

Personal life
Dilpazeer was born to a Pakistani family in Karachi, Pakistan. After completing her early education in Karachi, she was relocated to UAE with her family because of her father's employment. After spending some years in Dubai, Dilpazeer returned to Karachi in 2006. In her family, Dilpazeer was closest to her father. She remembers him as her "friend" and credits him for her many of her qualities. Besides being involved in television and theatre, Dilpazeer enjoys poetry and music and adores Roshan Ara Begum, Bade Ghulam Ali Khan, Master Madan and Begum Akhtar.

Career 
While Dilpazeer was in UAE, she pursued a career in radio. She wrote and performed radio plays. After returning to Pakistan, she started her career in 2006 in the Pakistani TV industry by obtaining the role of Saeeda in Burns Road Ki Nilofar, a telefilm by ARY Digital. Her acting in Burns Road Ki Nilofar was highly appreciated by the critics and the public.

Dilpazeer loves theater work very much and has performed in several theatre plays with one being National Academy of Performing Arts' Dil Ka Kya Rang Karoon.

Filmography

Film

Television

Actress

Presenter

Director

Awards and nominations

References

External links
 
  
  
 YouTube auto-generated site on Hina Dilpazeer

1969 births
Pakistani television actresses
20th-century Pakistani actresses
Pakistani film actresses
Pakistani television hosts
Pakistani women journalists
Actresses from Karachi
21st-century Pakistani actresses
ARY Digital people
Pakistani dramatists and playwrights
Living people
Women television journalists
Pakistani women television presenters
Actresses in Urdu cinema